Đa Nhim River (also Krong Pha or Song Pha) is a river in huyện Lạc Dương, Lâm Đồng Province, Vietnam. The Đa Nhim Hydroelectric Power Plant was built on the river during the 1960s to supply electricity to Saigon.

References

Rivers of Lâm Đồng province
Rivers of Vietnam